Dancenorth is a contemporary dance company based in Townsville, North Queensland, Australia. Founded as the North Queensland Ballet Company in 1969, Dancenorth performs for regional, national and international audiences. Dancenorth has presented work in over 35 International Arts Festivals and venues in Australia and the world.

The company
Dancenorth is a nonprofit organization managed by a board of directors. It is headquartered in the School of Arts building in Townsville City Centre. The building is Dancenorth's rehearsal space and 190-seat theatre.

People

Artistic Directors

General Managers

Dancers

The company currently employs seven full-time dancers.

History

North Queensland Ballet Company
Ann Roberts, Principle of the Ann Roberts School of Dancing, and parents in Townsville, were concerned by the lack of opportunities for young ballet dancers in North Queensland, organised a public meeting to assess public interest in forming a North Queensland ballet company.

The North Queensland Ballet and Dance Company was established 17 July 1969. From the first audition, 41 students were accepted.

Between 1970 and 1982, the North Queensland Ballet Company presented:
24 original ballets created especially for the company
3 productions with excerpts from full-length ballets
3 full-length ballets re-created for the company
2 historical ballets created especially for the company
10 one-act ballets created or re-created for the company.

From 1983 to 1984, 16 new works were created for the new profession/amateur company.

Dance North
In 1985 the company changed its name to Dance North becoming a contemporary dance institute with "a policy of all new Australian works", primarily training and performing in Townsville region but touring nationally and internationally.

1998 saw the premiere of Luuli, a collaboration between Dance North and Woomera Aboriginal Corporation which fused traditional Aboriginal dance with contemporary western dance. Luuli was watched by over 30,000 people nationally and internationally over several years.

Dancenorth-Australia
Dance North became dancenorth-australia in 2006. In 2007, it took to the streets to raise awareness of dance through their participation in local Townsville community events. On 15 February 2007, the then Governor of Queensland, Quentin Bryce AC accepted dancenorth's invitation to become the company's patron for the duration of her appointment as Governor.

Dancenorth
In 2008, Dancenorth-Australia changed its name to Dancenorth.

Productions

References 

Townsville
Dance companies in Australia
Contemporary dance companies
1969 establishments in Australia
Companies based in Queensland